Werner Konrad Graf von (count of) Moltke (24 May 1936 – 29 July 2019) was a German decathlete who won a European title in 1966 and finished second in 1962. He competed at the 1968 Summer Olympics, but failed to finish.

Von Moltke died on 29 July 2019.

References

1936 births
2019 deaths
West German decathletes
Olympic athletes of West Germany
Athletes (track and field) at the 1968 Summer Olympics
European Athletics Championships medalists
USC Mainz athletes
People from Mühlhausen
Sportspeople from Thuringia